Karl Friedrich von Savigny (19 September 1814 – 11 February 1875) was a Prussian diplomat, politician, and a leading member of the Centre Party. His father was the jurist Friedrich Carl von Savigny, who was then privy councillor of the court of appeals, member of the Prussian council of State, and professor at the University of Berlin, and his mother was Kunigunde Brentano, sister of the poet Clemens Brentano. The father was a Protestant, but the mother was a Catholic, and the children were allowed to follow the religion of the mother. Karl Friedrich was first taught at home, then attended the French Gymnasium at Berlin, the Collegium Romanum at Rome, and the Collegium Sebastianum at Naples. He studied law at Berlin, Munich, and Paris. In 1836 he became an auscultator at Berlin; in 1837 he was a referendar in the court at Aachen, in 1840 secretary of legation at London and Dresden, in 1842 at Lisbon, in 1848 at London. In 1849 he was councillor of legations and member of the ministry of foreign affairs, and in 1850 ambassador at Karlsruhe. While here he was able to win over the Government of Baden for the Prussian policy, and, as Bismarck testified, "by cautious and tactful bearing to win a commanding position at Karlsruhe for the Prussian government."

From 1859 Karl Friedrich was Prussian ambassador at Dresden, from 1862 at Brussels, and from 1864 he was minister with full powers at the Diet of the German Confederation at Frankfort. In 1866 he offered at the Diet the Prussian motion for the reform of the German Confederation, and when it was rejected on 14 June, 1866, he declared the withdrawal of Prussia, upon which the Austro-Prussian war began. Later in connection with Bismarck he was plenipotentiary in making a treaty of peace with the states of southern Germany and Saxony. He was the presiding officer of the government conferences for the drafting of a constitution for the North German Confederation, and was a plenipotentiary at the Reichstag which decided the constitution. Thus he performed important services in national affairs. In 1868 he retired partially, and in 1871 entirely, from government positions in order to become one of the parliamentary leaders of the Catholics. From 1867 he was a member of the Lower House of the Prussian Diet, from 1868 a member of the Lower House of the Diet of the North German Confederation, and later of the German Reichstag, or Parliament of the German Empire. In 1871 he took part in the founding of the Centre Party. He was not particularly distinguished as a speaker, but his knowledge, distinguished personality, and connections were of much benefit to the Catholic cause.  He believed that "laws are not made but found".

References

1814 births
1875 deaths
Centre Party (Germany) politicians
German Roman Catholics
Lorraine nobility
Politicians from Berlin
People from the Province of Brandenburg
Ambassadors of Prussia
Prussian politicians
Members of the Reichstag of the German Empire
19th-century diplomats